Page Regional Airport  is a privately owned, public use airport located four nautical miles (5 mi, 7 km) east of the central business district of Page, a city in Cass County, North Dakota, United States.

Facilities and aircraft 
Page Regional Airport covers an area of 26 acres (11 ha) at an elevation of 1,218 feet (371 m) above mean sea level. It has one runway designated 17/35 with an asphalt surface measuring 2,600 by 30 feet (792 x 9 m).

For the 12-month period ending August 31, 2009, the airport had 4,210 aircraft operations, an average of 11 per day: 95% general aviation, 4.8% air taxi, and 0.2% military. At that time there were 14 aircraft based at this airport: 86% single-engine and 14% multi-engine.

See also 
 List of airports in North Dakota

References

External links 
 Page Regional (64G) at North Dakota Aeronautics Commission
 Aerial image as of September 1997 from USGS The National Map
 

Airports in North Dakota
Buildings and structures in Cass County, North Dakota
Transportation in Cass County, North Dakota